The All-Party Parliamentary Group for Future Generations is an informal cross-party group with the parliament of the United Kingdom. Its role is to raise the profile of long-term issues, protect the interests of future generations, and provide a forum for discussion about ways to reduce short-termism in politics and policy making.

The group officially launched in 2018, with the assistance of Martin Rees, a member of the House of Lords, who has written extensively on the future of humanity and the potential dangers humanity might face.

The group's secretariat is the Centre for the Study of Existential Risk at Cambridge University.

Officers

References

External links 
 

All-Party Parliamentary Groups
Organizations associated with effective altruism